The , officially the , is Japanese funicular line in Sakyō, Kyōto, Kyōto, operated by Keifuku Electric Railroad. The line opened in 1925, as a western route to Enryaku-ji, a famous temple on Mount Hiei. The line has  vertical interval, the largest in the country.

Basic data
Distance: 
Gauge: 
Stations: 2
Vertical interval:

See also

List of funicular railways
List of railway lines in Japan
 Sakamoto Cable – on the other side of the mountain

External links 
  

Funicular railways in Japan
Rail transport in Kyoto Prefecture
1067 mm gauge railways in Japan
Railway lines opened in 1925
1925 establishments in Japan